The Badge of Honour for Fire Protection (German: Brandschutzehrenzeichen) is an award of the Free State of Thuringia for extraordinary commitment given to members of fire brigades in five ranks.

Thuringia
Orders, decorations, and medals of the states of Germany
Long service medals
Fire service awards and honors